Fokker Technologies is a Dutch aerospace company owned by British aerospace supplier GKN. The company has production companies which design, develop and produce structures, landing gear and electrical systems for the aerospace and defense industry. Additional to the production capabilities, it also supplies integrated maintenance services to aircraft owners and operators.

Operations 
Fokker Technologies designs, develops and produces advanced structures and electrical systems for the aerospace and defense industry and supplies integrated maintenance services and products to aircraft owners and operators.

The company consists of 4 business units:
 Fokker Aerostructures (Lightweight structures)
 Fokker Elmo (Wiring harnesses)
 Fokker Landing Gear (Landing gear)
 Fokker Services (Aerospace services provider)

History 
After the bankruptcy of the former aircraft manufacturer Fokker in 1996, Stork B.V. acquired the Fokker companies specialized in the building of aircraft components and aircraft maintenance services which were named as Stork Aerospace. The group has had many names until in 2010, the Fokker name was reintroduced.

In July 2015, the British aerospace supplier GKN announced that it intention to acquire Fokker Technologies from Arle Capital, at the value of €706 million. Fokker was acquired in the same year by GKN.

References

External links
Official website

Companies based in South Holland
Dutch companies established in 2011
Aerospace companies
Papendrecht
Manufacturing companies established in 2011
Defence companies of the Netherlands